Kari Anne Bøkestad Andreassen (born 16 December 1973) is a Norwegian politician for the Centre Party.

She served as a deputy representative to the Parliament of Norway from Nordland during the term 2017–2021. In her native Vevelstad she became deputy mayor in 2011 and mayor, the first female of that municipality, in 2015.

References

1973 births
Living people
People from Helgeland
Deputy members of the Storting
Centre Party (Norway) politicians
Mayors of places in Nordland
Women mayors of places in Norway
Women members of the Storting